Shana or Shanna may refer to:

People

Shana
 Shana Alexander (1925–2005), journalist
 Shana Cox (born 1985), athlete
 Shana Dale (born 1964), NASA deputy administrator
 Shana Hiatt (born 1975), model
 Shana Madoff (born 1967), compliance officer and attorney at the securities firm of Ponzi schemer Bernie Madoff, her uncle
 Shana Morrison (born 1970), singer-songwriter
 Shana Petrone (born 1972), American singer
 Shana Swash (born 1990), British actress
 Shana (singer), American singer Shana Petrone (born 1972)

Shanna
 Shanna Besson (born 1993), French actress
 Shanna (wrestler), Portuguese professional wrestler
 Shanna Collins (born 1983), American actress
 Shanna Compton, American poet
 Shanna Hogan (1982–2020), American writer
 Shanna Hudson (born 1985), Haitian former footballer
 Shanna McCullough (born 1960), American pornographic actress
 Shanna Moakler (born 1975), American model, actress and reality television star
 Shanna Reed (born 1955), American dancer and actress
 Shanna Swendson, American author
 Shanna Woyak, American Air Force personnel stub
 Shanna Young (born 1991), American mixed martial artist
 Shanna Zolman (born 1983), American professional basketball player

Fictional characters
 Shana Elmsford, in the 1980s cartoon series Jem
 Shana, in the 1999 video game The Legend of Dragoon
 Shana, in Shakugan no Shana
 Shana Fring, in the Pretty Little Liars book series
 Shanna the She-Devil, a jungle adventurer in the Marvel Comics universe
 Shanna, from the video game Fire Emblem: The Binding Blade

Places 
 Kurilsk, called Shana when it was under Japanese rule
 Shana, several towns and a clan during the Japanese administration of the Kuril Islands

Other uses 
 Shakugan no Shana, also known as simply Shana, a Japanese media franchise

Feminine given names